Kenneth Leslie Hopper (8 June 1924 – 29 June 2017) was an Australian rules footballer who played with Carlton and Hawthorn in the Victorian Football League (VFL).

Honours and achievements 
 Hawthorn life member

References

External links 

Ken Hopper's profile at Blueseum

1924 births
2017 deaths
Carlton Football Club players
Hawthorn Football Club players
Australian rules footballers from Victoria (Australia)
Pascoe Vale Football Club players